Kim So-hee (born 28 July 1992) is a South Korean taekwondo practitioner. 

She won a gold medal in featherweight at the 2013 World Taekwondo Championships in Puebla, by defeating Anna-Lena Frömming  in the semifinal, and Mayu Hamada in the final. She won a bronze medal in lightweight at the 2017 World Taekwondo Championships, being defeated in the semifinal by eventual gold medalist Ruth Gbagbi.

References

External links

1992 births
Living people
South Korean female taekwondo practitioners
World Taekwondo Championships medalists
Universiade medalists in taekwondo
Universiade bronze medalists for South Korea
21st-century South Korean women